The 2005 FIA Formula One World Championship was the 59th season of FIA Formula One motor racing. It featured the 56th FIA Formula One World Championship, contested over a then-record 19 Grands Prix. It commenced on 6 March 2005 and ended 16 October.

Fernando Alonso and the Renault team won the World Drivers' and World Constructors' championships, ending five years of dominance by Michael Schumacher and Ferrari since 2000 and also ending nine years of Ferrari, McLaren and Williams dominance triopoly since 1996. Alonso's success made him the youngest champion in the history of the sport, a title he held until Lewis Hamilton's 2008 title success. Renault's win was their first as a constructor. Alonso started the season off strongly, winning three of the first four races and his title success was in little doubt. He sealed the title in Brazil with two races left after a controlled third-place finish. Alonso's championship was also the first for a Renault-powered driver since Jacques Villeneuve's championship in 1997.

Alonso and Renault had to contend with the pace of the resurgent McLaren team with lead driver Kimi Räikkönen outshining teammate Juan Pablo Montoya, who came highly regarded from his time at Williams. Räikkönen won seven races like Alonso but would have won more if not for a series of reliability issues, resulting in qualifying engine change penalties and retirements from the lead on three occasions. Nevertheless, Räikkönen grabbed the headlines winning from near the back of the grid in Japan, passing Alonso's Renault teammate Giancarlo Fisichella on the final lap. Reigning champions Michael Schumacher and Ferrari had a poor season by their standards, with Bridgestone unable to compete with Michelin after the tyre-change ban that only affected the 2005 season. Their only win came when Michelin deemed their own tyres unsafe after several incidents in the oval turn at Indianapolis. As a result, only the six Bridgestone cars took part. Schumacher just held on for third in the Drivers' Championship, in spite of the superior pace of McLaren, underlining the disappointing season Montoya had. The Colombian missed two races early on due to a tennis injury. He then won three races, showing glimpses of pace, but was well beaten by his teammate Räikkönen in the championship.

The 2005 season was the last before the Minardi, BAR and Jordan teams were taken over by new owners and changed names to Toro Rosso, Honda, and Midland respectively in the  season. The former Jaguar team was sold from Ford to Red Bull GmbH and made its debut as Red Bull Racing during the 2005 season.

Teams and drivers 
The following teams and drivers were competitors in the 2005 FIA Formula One World Championship.

 † All engines were 3.0-litre, V10 configuration. 2005 was the final year of this engine formula.
 No Michelin-shod cars participated in the United States Grand Prix for safety reasons, leaving just six cars on the grid at the start of the race.

Free practice drivers
Five constructors entered free practice only drivers over the course of the season.

Team changes

 Red Bull Racing, which took over the Jaguar team, ran with Cosworth engines. Red Bull's lead driver was veteran Scotsman David Coulthard, paired with Christian Klien, the 2004 Jaguar driver. Toyota-powered Jordan Grand Prix was purchased by Midland Group, although the team continued as Jordan until 2006. Sauber switched from Bridgestone to Michelin tyres over the winter, further severing their ties with the Ferrari team.
 The BAR team was banned from the Grands Prix in Spain and Monaco, after both their cars were found to be underweight at the San Marino Grand Prix.
 At the Hungarian Grand Prix, West McLaren Mercedes became Team McLaren Mercedes.
 Shortly after the United States Grand Prix, Peter Sauber announced that Credit Suisse had sold BMW their majority share in his Sauber team, which announced its intention to run as BMW's factory team in 2006.

Driver changes
 Renault partnered Fernando Alonso with the 2004 Sauber driver Giancarlo Fisichella, in a straight swap with Jacques Villeneuve (who had taken over from Jarno Trulli at Renault for the last three races of the season).
 Williams employed an all-new driver line-up in 2005, having signed Jaguar's Mark Webber and Jordan's Nick Heidfeld to replace Juan Pablo Montoya and Ralf Schumacher. Montoya moved to McLaren, in place of the Red Bull-bound David Coulthard (who took Webber's vacated seat), while Ralf Schumacher signed for Toyota. This meant that Ricardo Zonta, who had raced for Toyota in five of the final six races of 2004, returned to a third driver role in 2005. Olivier Panis, who had driven in seventeen out of eighteen races for Toyota in 2004, was retained by the team in the dual capacity of advisor and test driver. Cristiano da Matta, who had started the 2004 season with Toyota, returned to Champ Car in 2005. Jarno Trulli joined as Toyota's second driver.
 Jordan's other driver from the end of 2004, Timo Glock, also switched to Champ Car for 2005, leaving Jordan with two vacant seats. They were taken by Tiago Monteiro (a test driver for Minardi in 2004) and Narain Karthikeyan, both Formula One debutants, who had both competed in the previous year's World Series by Nissan season. Giorgio Pantano, who raced for Jordan for the majority of 2004, left Formula One altogether, joining the Super Nova Racing team for the inaugural GP2 Series season.
 Minardi also ran an all-new line-up in 2005, with their 2004 drivers—Gianmaria Bruni (who switched to GP2 in 2005) and Zsolt Baumgartner—being replaced by a pair of debutants: Patrick Friesacher and Christijan Albers, who had competed in International Formula 3000 and DTM, respectively, during the previous season.

Mid-season changes
 BAR test driver Anthony Davidson raced in Malaysia in place of an ill Takuma Sato. Sato returned to the seat for the next race.
 Following a shoulder injury to Juan Pablo Montoya, McLaren reserve driver Pedro de la Rosa raced for the team in Bahrain, with Alexander Wurz taking on third driver duties in place of de la Rosa. For the San Marino Grand Prix, de la Rosa and Wurz swapped roles. Montoya returned for the following race.
 Vitantonio Liuzzi and Christian Klien were both contracted to Red Bull Racing to participate in at least three races, and agreed to share their race seat for the season. While Klien, who had raced for the team's forerunners Jaguar in 2004, drove in the first three races, Liuzzi replaced him for the San Marino, Spanish, Monaco, and European Grands Prix. Klien returned for the Canadian Grand Prix, and completed the remainder of the season.
 Robert Doornbos was Jordan's third driver for nine of the first eleven races of the season. Franck Montagny replaced him at the European Grand Prix, while Jordan were banned from using a third car at the Canadian Grand Prix after using too many tyres at the previous race. Nicolas Kiesa replaced Doornbos for the German Grand Prix onwards, when the Dutchman replaced Patrick Friesacher at Minardi due to sponsorship issues.
 Chanoch Nissany became Minardi's third driver for the Hungarian Grand Prix. He was replaced by Enrico Toccacelo for the Turkish Grand Prix and Italian Grand Prix. Nissany was the first Israeli to participate in a Formula One weekend.
 Antônio Pizzonia replaced Nick Heidfeld at Williams for the Italian Grand Prix, when Heidfeld decided to withdraw after complaining of a severe headache. Earlier in the week, he had crashed heavily during a test session at Monza. Heidfeld had been due to return for the Brazilian Grand Prix, but after having a motorcycle accident he was forced to sit out the remainder of the season, with Pizzonia continuing to race for Williams in Heidfeld's absence.

Season calendar
The 2005 Formula One calendar featured one new event, the Turkish Grand Prix.

Calender changes
 With the Brazilian Grand Prix being run in late September, the Chinese Grand Prix became the final race of the season.

Regulation changes 
For a time there existed a distinct possibility that some teams would be running three race cars per Grand Prix: fewer than 10 teams, or 20 cars, starting on the grid would have resulted in some teams running three cars, under a term in the Concorde Agreement. By the first round of the season, there were ten teams, as Red Bull completed their takeover of Jaguar and were ready to race in Australia. Minardi, which initially received an injunction allowing them to compete despite their cars' non-conformity to new 2005 technical regulations, later modified their cars to adhere to 2005 regulations.

Technical regulations 
 A major change in 2005 was the outlawing of tyre changes during pit stops. Now a driver had to use one set of tyres during qualifying and the race itself. The reason for this rule change was to motivate the teams to select harder tyre compounds with less grip, reducing cornering speeds, which was intended to improve safety. Tyre changes were allowed for punctures and for wet weather, under the direction of the FIA. The FIA had to post a "change in climatic conditions" notice in order for tyre changes to occur normally as a force majeure. After Kimi Räikkönen's disastrous accident at the Nurburgring when his suspension collapsed after a flat-spotted tyre ripped the carbon fibre suspension apart, team principals and the FIA agreed that a single tyre change per car could be made without penalty, provided it was to change a tyre that had become dangerously worn like Räikkönen's had. Preserving a single set of tyres for the entire race became a new challenge for drivers; the challenge for tyre manufactures was to produce more durable, long-lasting compounds. Michelin-shod runners had a distinct advantage over their Bridgestone counterparts.
 Formula One engines had to last two race weekends, double that demanded by 2004 regulations. A driver who needed to change an engine was subject to a 10-place grid penalty for the race. Designed to limit revs and power outputs demanded by greater reliability, this regulation was also a cost-cutting measure for engine manufacturers.  After the initial race of the season, the FIA acted to close a loophole in this new regulation exposed by BAR, who deliberately pitted their cars rather than finish the race.
 The technical aerodynamics regulations were modified to improve competition, especially for cars travelling in another car's air flow wake in order to overtake. By changing the size and placement of both front and rear wings, as well as requiring higher noses, the new rules attempted to reduce downforce by roughly one-quarter, but teams developed other chassis innovations to reclaim much of that "lost" downforce, which made following another car even harder than the previous season.
 This was the final season in which the 3.0-litre V10 engine configuration was used by all teams. New changes in the technical regulations saw a 2.4-litre V8 engine configuration being introduced by the FIA for the 2006 Formula One season; however, the FIA granted an exemption for teams who were unable to re-engineer (or various reasons, or could not afford a V8 engine in time for 2006. Budget or resource-limited teams were allowed to run a rev-limited 3.0-litre V10. Ten of the eleven teams ran with a conventional 2.4L V8 for 2006, with the exception of Scuderia Toro Rosso, who continued and were permitted by the FIA to use a rev-limited Cosworth TJ2006 3.0L V10 powerplant.

Sporting regulations 
 The first six races of the 2005 season used a new qualifying format, marking the third year in five with sharply revised qualifying rules. Grid position was determined by aggregate times from two single-lap flying runs, one Saturday afternoon and one Sunday morning. Refueling was allowed after the first qualifying run Saturday; however, the car must have been fuelled for the race for Sunday's qualifying.  (Although some rules changes are brought about to even the playing field or to reduce costs, this rule change was prompted by the typhoon which rescheduled qualifying for the 2004 Japanese Grand Prix).  Adverse weather conditions affecting either qualifying session impacted the final, aggregate time. On 24 May, the ten team bosses met with Max Mosley and recommended a return to a single, one-lap qualifying run on Saturday on race fuel and race tires, which, having been approved by the FIA World Motor Sport Council, took effect at the European Grand Prix on 29 May.
 If a driver stalled his car while entering the final grid, the other cars were sent instantly to a new warm-up lap, instead of all drivers stopping their cars and waiting a couple of minutes for a new start. The stalled car is pushed to the pit lane and the grid is clear when the drivers return.
 When the race was red-flagged, the timekeeping system would not stop. The drivers would stop on the start/finish straight, and the restart would take place behind the safety car instead of a standing start which was used earlier. Although this rule came in effect in 2005, it was first used at the 2007 European Grand Prix.
 Also in safety car situations, the rules were changed to allow the safety car to use the pit lane if necessary. This rule change was made following Ralf Schumacher's accident in 2004 United States Grand Prix.

Season report
The most-noted aspect of the season was Ferrari's lack of pace caused mainly by a new rule prohibiting tyre changes during the course of a race. The Bridgestone tyres used by Ferrari could not find the right balance between performance and reliability, leaving the Michelin runners to battle for race victories. Further rule changes emphasised the new focus on reliability, with engines required to last two Grands Prix without being changed.

Renault appeared the fastest team in pre-season testing and it was no surprise they dominated the early fly-away rounds. Giancarlo Fisichella won the season opener in Australia before teammate Alonso demonstrated his title credentials with a series of victories in Malaysia, Bahrain and San Marino. As the season progressed the McLarens of Kimi Räikkönen and Juan Pablo Montoya became increasingly competitive and by the latter stages of the season the McLaren was generally considered the faster package. However, constant technical failures meant neither the team nor Räikkönen were able to translate their speed into championship success.

Alonso secured his Drivers' Championship with a third-place finish in the Brazilian Grand Prix. Despite both him and Räikkönen having six victories to their name at this point in the season, Alonso's greater consistency meant he was able to claim the championship with two rounds to spare. The Constructors' Championship was secured by Renault at the final race, with Alonso's seventh victory of the year. This gave Renault their first championship as a constructor (after only previously triumphing as an engine supplier) despite winning two fewer races than McLaren.

Ferrari finished third in the Constructors' Championship with only one win, at the United States Grand Prix, a race that was only contested by the six Bridgestone cars after Michelin declared their tyres unsafe to run in the Indianapolis Motor Speedway's unique banked corner.

After a high-flying 2004 season the most conspicuous drop in performance after Ferrari was BAR-Honda, who were banned from two races after scrutineers in San Marino discovered a hidden fuel compartment that allowed their cars to run underweight. They were beaten in the championship by Williams, whose engine partner BMW had announced they were leaving to join Sauber in June, and Toyota, who achieved 5 podium finishes and were only beaten to third in the championship because of Ferrari's 1–2 in Indianapolis.

All the teams scored world championship points over the course of the season, Minardi scoring rare points in their final season courtesy of being able to run in the US race. The  2005 season  also saw nine different drivers score a pole position -  setting a new record  for the number of different polesitters in a season eclipsing the previous record of eight different polesitters set in the 1968 season. This tally of different polesitters remains a record as of the end of the 2022 championship.

Results and standings 
The 2005 Formula One calendar featured a new event in Turkey, just miles from the Europe–Asia dividing line. The newly built circuit in Istanbul joined the 2004 newcomers Bahrain and China. The 2005 season witnessed two of the hottest Grands Prix ever: the track temperature at the beginning of the Malaysian event was 51 °C (124 °F), while in Bahrain the mercury soared past 56 °C (133 °F).

Grands Prix

Scoring system

Points were awarded to the top eight classified finishers.

World Drivers' Championship standings

Notes:
 – Drivers did not finish the Grand Prix, but were classified as they completed more than 90% of the race distance.
 – Teams supplied with Michelin tyres elected to withdraw from the  before the race started due to safety concerns.

World Constructors' Championship standings 

Notes:
 – Drivers did not finish the Grand Prix, but were classified as they completed more than 90% of the race distance.
 – Teams supplied with Michelin tyres elected to withdraw from the  before the race started due to safety concerns.

Notes

References

External links 

formula1.com – 2005 official driver standings (archived)
formula1.com – 2005 official team standings (archived)
2005 Formula One season images Retrieved from www.motorsport.com on 5 December 2008

Formula One seasons
 
Formula 1